Dmitri Soloviev (born 1989) is a Russian ice dancer

Dmitri Solovyov may also refer to:

 Dmitry Solovyov (judoka) (born 1963), Uzbekistani judoka